More of That Guitar Country is the twenty-seventh studio album by US country musician Chet Atkins. It is a follow-up to his Guitar Country release and was more successful. His rendition of "Yakety Sax" by Boots Randolph earned Atkins a hit on the country singles charts. A mix of traditional fingerpicking, country-flavored pop and traditional country, the album peaked at number 4 on the Billboard Country charts.

More of That Guitar Country and "Yakety Axe" were nominated for four 1965 Grammy awards but did not win any.

Reception

In an Allmusic review, critic Richard S. Ginell wrote of the album "... one of Atkins' least-cluttered, mostly reined-in, and most musical albums of the mid-'60s, searching for good material wherever he can find it, even outside the cloistered world of Nashville."

Reissues
 More of That Guitar Country and Guitar Country were reissued together on CD in 2001 on the Collectibles label.

Track listing

Side one
 "Yakety Axe" (Boots Randolph, James Rich) – 2:04
 "Back Up and Push" (Traditional; arranged by Chet Atkins) – 2:13
 "Cloudy and Cool" (John D. Loudermilk) – 2:19
 "Alone and Forsaken" (Hank Williams) – 2:41
 "Old Joe Clark" (Traditional; arranged by Chet Atkins) – 2:08
 "Catch the Wind" (Donovan) – 2:03

Side two
 "How's the World Treating You" (Atkins, Boudleaux Bryant) – 2:39
 "Understand Your Man" (Johnny Cash) – 2:02
 "Letter Edged in Black" (Traditional) – 2:06
 "My Town" (Atkins) – 2:20
 "Blowin' in the Wind" (Bob Dylan) – 2:24
 "The Last Letter" (Rex Griffin) – 2:23

Personnel
Chet Atkins – guitar
Jerry Smith – piano
Charlie McCoy – harmonica

Production
Engineered by Al Pachucki and Chuck Seitz

References

1965 albums
Chet Atkins albums
Albums produced by Bob Ferguson (music)
RCA Victor albums